Terry Stoepel (February 8, 1945 – February 12, 2016) was an American football tight end. He played for the Chicago Bears in 1967 and for the Houston Oilers in 1970.

He died on February 12, 2016, in Justin, Texas at age 71.

References

1945 births
2016 deaths
American football tight ends
Tulsa Golden Hurricane football players
Chicago Bears players
Houston Oilers players